Football Club Lorient Bretagne Sud (commonly referred to FC Lorient or simply Lorient) is a French association football club based in Lorient, Brittany. The club was founded in 1926 and currently competes in Ligue 1, the top flight of French football, following promotion from Ligue 2 in the 2019–20 season. Lorient plays its home matches at the Stade Yves Allainmat, named after the former mayor of Lorient. The stadium is surnamed Stade du Moustoir because of its location within the city. The team is managed by Régis Le Bris.

Lorient had a relatively bleak history nationally before 1998 when the club made its first appearance in Ligue 1 in the 1998–99 season. Before that, Lorient spent most of its life as an amateur club. Lorient's achieved its biggest honour in 2002 when the club won the Coupe de France defeating Bastia 1–0 in the final. Lorient has never won Ligue 1, but has won the Championnat National earning this honour in 1995. Regionally, the club has won five Brittany Division d'Honneur titles and six Coupe de Bretagne.

Lorient has most notably served as a springboard club for several present-day internationals such as Laurent Koscielny, André-Pierre Gignac, Michaël Ciani, Kevin Gameiro, Karim Ziani, Bakari Koné, Matteo Guendouzi, and Seydou Keita. French international Yoann Gourcuff, the son of Christian Gourcuff, began his career at the club before moving to Derby Breton rivals Rennes.

History
Football Club Lorient was founded on 2 April 1926. Lorient was formed off of La Marée Sportive, a club founded a year earlier by Madame Cuissard, a store patron who originated from Saint-Étienne, and her son Joseph. The club began play as an amateur club under the Czechoslovakian manager Jozef Loquay and won the Champions de l'Ouest in 1929, which placed the club into the Division d'Honneur of the Brittany region. In 1932, Lorient won the league and, four years later, repeated this performance. The onset of World War II limited the club's meteoric rise in the region and the departure of several players who either joined the war effort or left to play abroad effectively disseminated the club.

Following the war, Antoine Cuissard, the grandson of Madame Cuissard, joined the club as a player with intentions of rebuilding it in honour of his grandmother. Lorient began play in the Division d'Honneur. Cuissard began one of the first Lorient players to maintain a place in the France national team while playing with the club. In 1954, he played on the team that qualified for the 1954 FIFA World Cup. Lorient quickly recovered and, by 1948, was playing in the Championnat de France amateur (CFA). The club spent two years in the league before falling back to the Division d'Honneur. In 1957, Lorient was promoted back to the CFA, but struggled due to being limited financially. Subsequently, the club sought sponsors with the hopes of becoming professional. In 1967, under the chairmanship of both Jean Tomine and René Fougère, Lorient placed a bid to turn professional and was elected to Division 2 by the French League. Incoming president Henri Ducassou agreed to do his best to make professionalism prosper in Lorient.

In the second division, Lorient struggled in the early seventies to consistently stay up in the league table. In the 1974–75 and 1975–76 seasons, the club came close to promotion to Division 1, finishing 3rd in its group on each occasion, one place short of the promotion play-offs. However, the following season, Lorient was relegated to Division 3. The potential of that team had proved above its classification when the club qualified for its first French FA Cup quarter-finals in history. The club subsequently struggled financially and domestically. It went bankrupt in 1978. During this period, under the name "Club des Supporters du FC Lorient" (the supporters legally took over to keep the FC Lorient name alive), Lorient played in the Division Supérieure Régionale (sixth tier of the French football pyramid). In the early 1980s, Georges Guenoum took over the club as president and hired former Lorient player Christian Gourcuff as manager. Surprisingly, under Gourcuff, Lorient quickly climbed back up the French football ladder. In 1983, the club won the Brittany Division d'Honneur title and, the following season, won Division 4. In 1985, they won Division 3 and so were back in Division 2 eight years after their demise at that level! Gourcuff left the club after its first Division 2 campaign, with relegation only being effective through an unfavourable goal difference. Lorient spent the next five years in Division 3 playing under two managers. It went financially bust again in 1990 but was nevertheless allowed to stay in Division 3. In 1991, Gourcuff returned to the club and after almost a decade playing in Division 3, Lorient earned promotion back to Division 2 after winning the second edition of the Championnat National.

Lorient spent two seasons in the second division and, in the 1997–98 season, surprised many by running away with the league alongside champions Nancy. The 1998–99 season marked Lorient's first appearance in Division 1 in the club's history. The appearance was brief with Lorient struggling to meet the financial demands and stronger competition of the league. The club finished in 16th place and were relegated. Amazingly, Lorient finished equal on points with Le Havre with both clubs having the same number of wins, losses, and draws. However, due to Le Havre having a better goal difference, Lorient was relegated. After only two seasons in Division 2, Lorient were back in the first division for the 2001–02 season. Before the promotion, in April 2001, a takeover of the club led by Alain Le Roch led to internal problems, which resulted in the departure of Gourcuff and one of the club's best players, Ulrich Le Pen, soon after. The club hired Argentine manager Ángel Marcos to replace Gourcuff. However, Marcos lasted only a few months.

Despite the initial issues, Lorient strengthened its squad in preparation for its return to the first division by recruiting players such as Pascal Delhommeau, Moussa Saïb, Johan Cavalli, and Pape Malick Diop. Led by Yvon Pouliquen, the new signings joined the likes of Jean-Claude Darcheville, Arnaud Le Lan, and Seydou Keita and surprised many by reaching the final of the Coupe de la Ligue. Lorient was defeated by Bordeaux in the final. Lorient continued its impressive cup form by winning the Coupe de France just two months later. In the match, Lorient faced Bastia and defeated the Corsicans 1–0 courtesy of a goal from Darcheville. The title was the club's first major honour. The celebration would however end on a sourer note as Lorient was relegated from league play in the same season. The club participated in the UEFA Cup the following season, falling to Turkish side Denizlispor in the first round on away goals.

Lorient returned to the first division, now called Ligue 1, in 2006 with a completely revamped team. Instead of spending money on players, the club focused its efforts on improving its academy and promoted several players to the first-team such as André-Pierre Gignac, Virgile Reset, Jérémy Morel, and Diego Yesso during the club's stint in Ligue 2. Lorient was also influenced by the arrival of the Malian international Bakari Koné. The club, in its return to Ligue 1, finished mid-table in three straight seasons. In the 2009–10 season, Lorient performed well domestically. In October 2009, the club reached 5th place in the table; its highest position that late in the season ever. Lorient eventually finished the campaign in 7th place; its best finish in Ligue 1.

In the 2016-2017 Ligue 1 season, Lorient played against Ligue 2 side ES Troyes in the promotion/relegation play off match. Lorient lost the tie 2–1 and were relegated to Ligue 2 after an 11 year stay in the top flight.

On 30 April 2020, Lorient were promoted to Ligue 1 after the LFP decided to end the seasons of both Ligue 1 and Ligue 2 early due to the Coronavirus pandemic.  Lorient were top of the Ligue 2 table at the time of the decision.

Players

Current squad

Out on loan

Reserve squad

Former players
For a complete list of FC Lorient players with a Wikipedia article, see :Category:FC Lorient players

Management and staff

Club officials
Senior club staff
President: Loïc Féry
General Director: Arnaud Tanguy
Sports coordinator:Aziz Mady Mogne
Manager: Régis Le Bris
Assistant manager: Julien Outrebon, Ingo Goetze
Goalkeeper coach:Olivier Lagarde , Ronald Thomas
Scout:Stéphane Pédron, Baptiste Drouet, Jérôme Fougeron
Club doctor:Vincent Detaille
Medical Director Physiotherapy:Régis Bouyaux

Coaching history

Honours

Domestic
Ligue 2
Champions: 2019–20
Championnat National
Champions: 1994–95
Coupe de France
Champions: 2001–02
Coupe de la Ligue
Runners-up: 2001–02
Trophée des Champions
Runners-up: 2002

Regional
Division d'Honneur (Bretagne)
Champions (5): 1932, 1936, 1957, 1983, 1995
Coupe de Bretagne
Champions (6): 1958, 1970, 1982, 1990, 2000, 2002

European football

References

 
Sport in Lorient
Association football clubs established in 1926
1926 establishments in France
Football clubs in Brittany
Ligue 1 clubs